Glass melting might refer to:
Commercial glass melting using fossil fuels
Commercial electric glass melting
Glass melting in the laboratory